The Smith special counsel investigation is an ongoing investigation opened by U.S. Attorney General, Merrick Garland, on November 18, 2022, to continue two investigations that had been initiated by the Department of Justice (DOJ). Garland appointed Jack Smith, a longtime federal prosecutor, to lead the independent investigations. Smith was tasked with investigating former president Donald Trump's role in the January 6 United States Capitol attack, and Trump's mishandling of government records, including classified documents.

Smith moved quickly to advance his investigations, assembling a team of at least twenty DOJ prosecutors, and within days had called witnesses for grand jury testimony, issued subpoenas to election officials in multiple states and asked a federal judge to hold Trump in contempt for refusing to comply with a subpoena.

Origin
Upon Garland's confirmation as attorney general, the DOJ opened at least three investigations into events during the closing weeks of the Trump presidency. The first investigation to be publicly known involved the people and events surrounding the January 6 attack on the Capitol. Later, an investigation into the Trump fake electors plot became known, followed by an investigation into Trump's handling of government documents he took from the White House to his Mar-a-Lago home. Smith was appointed to assume the investigations into Trump's role leading to the January 6 attack and of his removal from the White House of government documents, some of which were highly-sensitive.

Timeline

2022 
Within days of his appointment, Smith began issuing grand jury subpoenas to local officials in Arizona, Michigan and Wisconsin, three key battleground states in the 2020 election, demanding they provide all communications they had with Trump, his campaign, and aides and associates. By December, local officials in Georgia, New Mexico, Nevada and Pennsylvania had also been subpoenaed. Georgia Secretary of State Brad Raffensperger was issued a grand jury subpoena in December. During a  January 2021 recorded phone call, Trump had pressured Raffensperger to "find" sufficient votes needed to secure his victory in the state.

CNN reported in December 2022 that Smith began investigating Trump's state of mind and what he knew about efforts by many to overturn the 2020 presidential election he had lost. He called key Trump White House personnel to testify before a grand jury, including White House counsel Pat Cipollone and his deputy Patrick Philbin, Trump senior policy advisor Stephen Miller and three other close aides to the president. Smith asked Beryl Howell, chief judge of the DC District Court, to hold Trump in contempt for failure to fully comply with an August 2022 DOJ subpoena, as prosecutors suspected Trump may have withheld some documents subject to the subpoena; Howell declined to hold Trump in contempt, asking both parties to continue working toward a resolution.

Smith's grand jury investigated fundraising and disbursements by Trump's Save America PAC, which had been created days after the November 2020 election. In late 2022, subpoenas were sent to Rudy Giuliani about payments he received from the PAC, and to other witnesses close to Trump. By February 2023, numerous Save America PAC vendors had been subpoenaed to determine how they had been paid and whether they delivered genuine services or concealed who had actually been paid.

On December 11, 2022, former U.S. attorney Preet Bharara predicted that the DOJ would bring charges in January. He noted that Smith had been hiring people who had "left their former positions, both in government and private practice", suggesting a major legal action in the works.

Any legal case against Trump would be increasingly politicized in public discourse as the 2024 presidential election approaches. On December 12, 2022, Jennifer Rodgers, a legal analyst for CNN, noted that DOJ (which had not yet charged Trump with a crime) would find it difficult to finish any hypothetical case before the election. She said DOJ might prioritize charging Trump in the documents case given that a conviction might be reached more quickly than in the January 6 case.

Contractors hired by Trump in late 2022 found additional documents marked classified, and Trump attorneys gave them to the special counsel in December 2022.

2023 
In January:

 Smith hired Raymond Hulser, former chief of public integrity at DOJ, and David Harbach, who'd previously led cases against a U.S. senator and a governor.
 Smith subpoenaed former Trump chief of state Mark Meadows for documents and testimony related to January 6.
 A laptop and thumb drive belonging to a former Oval Office aide, Chamberlain Harris, were handed over. Harris had scanned some documents, consisting of Trump's travel schedules, onto her two devices, evidently unaware they were classified.
 The special counsel subpoenaed an empty manila folder marked "Classified Evening Briefing" that had been found by the contractors in Trump's Mar-a-Lago bedroom. The folder had been reported to the special counsel but wasn't handed over until it was subpoenaed. One of Trump's lawyers claimed in February that Trump had been using the empty folder to shield an annoying light at his bedside.
 Trump attorneys Evan Corcoran and Christina Bobb testified before a grand jury. Corcoran had reportedly drafted a June 2022 letter, signed by Bobb, attesting that, in response to a subpoena, a diligent search was conducted and no classified documents remained at Mar-a-Lago; however, thousands of documents, over a hundred of which had classified markings, were subsequently found in the August 2022 FBI search.
 Trump attorney Alina Habba also appeared before a grand jury. Habba did not represent Trump regarding the documents matter, but she had spoken about it on television.

On January 12, CNN reported that the investigators sought to learn who was paying the legal bills of subpoena recipients.

On January 26, former Department of Homeland Security official Ken Cuccinelli testified before the grand jury.

On January 26, Senate Intelligence Committee chair Mark Warner said the committee wanted to see the classified documents immediately (the ones found in Trump's and Biden's possession) and did not want to "wait until a special prosecutor blesses the intelligence committee’s oversight".

On January 30, the two people who had been hired to search four locations in October 2022 for classified documents —Trump’s Bedminster golf club, Trump Tower in New York, an office location in Florida and a storage unit in Florida — testified before a federal grand jury.

In early February, the government offered to brief certain members of Congress—the leaders of the House and Senate, and the leaders of the intelligence committees—on the status of the classified documents investigation. It was also reported that more documents with classified markings had been found during a search of Mar-a-Lago "weeks" earlier, in the presence of Trump's legal team.

Subpoenas reported in February included:

 Former Trump national security advisor Robert O'Brien. The subpoena sought information about the Capitol attack and the documents removal. O'Brien had been asserting executive privilege to withhold some information requested by the special counsel.
 Former vice president Mike Pence for documents and testimony, following months of negotiations between his legal team and prosecutors, about his interactions with Trump leading up to the 2020 election and on the day of the attack on the Capitol. On March 3, Pence challenged his subpoena with a separation of powers argument. He argued that, as a vice president who was performing his job as president of the Senate on January 6, 2021, he was temporarily a member of the legislative branch, so the Speech or Debate Clause of the Constitution protects him from being "questioned" about his activity that day. The strategy had been previously reported. On February 24, 2023, influential conservative jurist J. Michael Luttig, who had advised Pence to not bow to Trump's pressure on January 6, published an essay in The New York Times saying Pence's objection would not succeed. In a separate action on March 3, Trump attorneys asked a judge to block Pence's testimony based on  executive privilege, after the special counsel had asked judge Howell to compel Pence's testimony. 
 At least three Republican Arizona state legislators, and at least one former legislator. The subpoenas demanded communications with Trump or his campaign members, specifically naming 18 individuals.
 Ivanka Trump and Jared Kushner.

In February, Smith asked federal judge Beryl Howell in a sealed motion for approval to invoke the crime-fraud exception to pierce attorney-client privilege and compel Corcoran to answer certain questions before the grand jury. The move indicated prosecutors suspected Trump or his allies may have used Corcoran's services in furtherance of a crime. On March 17, Judge Howell ruled that DOJ had justified the crime-fraud exception, and she ordered Corcoran to testify again.

CNN reported on March 16 that the special counsel had subpoenaed at least two dozen people at Mar-a-Lago, from resort staff to members of Trump's inner circle.

Reactions
On February 22, 2023, Timothy Heaphy, who had served as the top investigator on the January 6 House select committee, said he expected "indictments both in Georgia and at the federal level.”

See also
FBI search of Mar-a-Lago
Mueller special counsel investigation
Public hearings of the United States House Select Committee on the January 6 Attack
United States Justice Department investigation into attempts to overturn the 2020 presidential election

References

External links

2022 establishments in the United States
2022 in American politics
United States Department of Justice
Donald Trump controversies
January 6 United States Capitol attack